National Tertiary Route 402, or just Route 402 (or ) is a National Road Route of Costa Rica, located in the Cartago province.

Description
In Cartago province the route covers Alvarado canton (Pacayas district), Oreamuno canton (Cot, Santa Rosa districts).

References

Highways in Costa Rica